Bárbara D'Achille (1941-1989) was a Latvian-Peruvian journalist and conservationist. She was born in Latvia but spent most of her adult life in Western Europe and South America. She wrote for El Comercio, where she managed a regular ecology section. Brown describes her as Peru's foremost environmental journalist. She also consulted for the World Wildlife Fund and other international NGOs. In 1989 she was killed by members of Shining Path while traveling in Huancavelica. She was 48. Pampa Galeras – Barbara D'Achille National Reserve is named after her, as is the Manu parrotlet (Nannopsittaca dachilleae).

References

Victims of Shining Path
Peruvian women journalists
Assassinated Peruvian journalists
Environmental writers
1989 deaths
1941 births